Vernon Winstanley (10 October 1861 – 10 January 1938) was a member of the Queensland Legislative Assembly.

Early days
Winstanley was born in Pilley, Yorkshire, to parents Thomas Winstanley and his wife Jane (née Wells). He was educated in Pilley and before the age of twelve was working in a coal mine. He came to Australia while still a young man and settled in Charters Towers where he took a leading part in worker's organisations.

Political career
In 1900, Winstanley was a councilor on the Charters Towers Shire Council and in 1908, standing for the Labour Party, he won the seat of Charters Towers in the Queensland Legislative Assembly. He moved to the seat of Queenton in 1912. He held Queenton for the next twenty years until retiring in 1932.

During his time in state politics he was Government Whip from 1915 until 1929.

Personal life
On 5 February 1890, Winstanley married Sarah Kate Brookes and together had one son and six daughters. He died at St Martin's Hospital, Brisbane, in 1938 and his funeral proceeded from the Morningside Methodist Church to the Balmoral Cemetery.

Street name
A number of street names in the Brisbane suburb of Carina Heights are identical to the surnames of former Members of the Queensland Legislative Assembly. One of these is Winstanley Street.

References

Members of the Queensland Legislative Assembly
1861 births
1938 deaths